Steven Eugene Foster Jr. (born August 16, 1966) is an American former professional baseball player and coach. He played in Major League Baseball (MLB) as a right-handed pitcher for the Cincinnati Reds from 1991 to 1993. Foster was the pitching coach for the Colorado Rockies from 2015 to 2021. Following the 2021 season, Foster took a different position with the Rockies—director of pitching—to spend more time with his family.

High school and college
Foster was born in Dallas, Texas and attended DeSoto High School in DeSoto, Texas where he played football and basketball as well as baseball. He amassed a 44–4 record and twice earned All-State honors pitching at DeSoto High, and led his team to the second State Championship in school history his senior year. He attended nearby Blinn College for a year before transferring to the University of Texas at Arlington. He also earned a Bachelor of Science degree from the University of Wisconsin-Stevens Point in 1998 while serving as an assistant coach with the baseball team (1997–1998).

Cincinnati Reds
He was drafted by the Cincinnati Reds in the twelfth round of the 1988 Major League Baseball draft, and went 9–21 with a 2.80 earned run average and 72 saves over four seasons in their farm system to earn a call to Cincinnati in August . He gave up three earned runs in fourteen innings over the remainder of the season. Foster began the  season with the Reds, but was optioned back to the triple A Nashville Sounds in the beginning of May. He pitched exceptionally once he returned, going 0–1 with a 2.13 ERA and two saves. The one loss came in his one career start against the New York Mets.

He began the  season as Rob Dibble's set-up man, but began experiencing arm trouble toward the end of May. In one of the most notoriously strange baseball injuries, Foster landed on the disabled list with an inflammation of his right shoulder after a segment on The Tonight Show with Jay Leno in which he threw baseballs at milk bottles.

After a monthlong trip to the DL, Foster returned for one appearance in June. After which, it was learned that Foster had detached cartilage in his right shoulder and would be out for the rest of the season. After suffering numerous setbacks, he had a second surgery in August. After three brief appearances with the Chattanooga Lookouts, his career was over.

Coaching
He spent two years at the University of Michigan coaching a baseball camp for college students before returning to the Rays as a scout in  & . In , he began managing the Wisconsin Woodchucks of the Northwoods Collegiate Summer Baseball League. Following the  season, he resigned to become youth pastor at Highland Community Church in Wausau, Wisconsin.

On October 9, 2009, Foster declined the team's contract offer for the  season. Shortly afterwards, he joined the Kansas City Royals organization.

On November 4, 2014, he was hired as the pitching coach for the Colorado Rockies. On October 26, 2021, it was announced that Foster would be named the Rockies director of pitching, replacing incumbent Mark Wiley.

Personal life
Foster is a devout Christian who, while serving as youth pastor at Highland Community Church, took the youth group on a missionary trip to the Dominican Republic. He and his wife, Cori, live in Frisco, Texas and have two children.

References

Lessons from Little League and Life (2007 Sunshine Mountain Press)

External links

Colorado Rockies coaching bio
Sports Illustrated

1966 births
Living people
People from DeSoto, Texas
Baseball coaches from Texas
Baseball players from Dallas
Major League Baseball pitchers
Cincinnati Reds players
Major League Baseball bullpen coaches
Major League Baseball pitching coaches
Florida Marlins coaches
Kansas City Royals coaches
Colorado Rockies (baseball) coaches
Tampa Bay Devil Rays scouts
Blinn Buccaneers baseball players
UT Arlington Mavericks baseball players
Billings Mustangs players
Cedar Rapids Reds players
Chattanooga Lookouts players
Nashville Sounds players
Minor league baseball coaches
Michigan Wolverines baseball coaches
Wisconsin–Stevens Point Pointers baseball coaches
University of Wisconsin–Stevens Point alumni
Wisconsin Woodchucks players